Alenkino is a rural locality (a village) in Nikolskoye Rural Settlement, Kaduysky District, Vologda Oblast, Russia. The population was 11 as of 2002.

Geography 
Alenkino is located 49 km north of Kaduy (the district's administrative centre) by road. Krasnoye is the nearest rural locality.

References 

Rural localities in Kaduysky District